Thomas H. MacDonald was a British stage and film actor.

Selected filmography
 Lights of London (1914)
 The Woman Who Did (1915)
 Jack Tar (1915)
 Five Nights (1915)
 Do Unto Others (1915)
 Jane Shore (1915)
 The Tailor of Bond Street (1916)
 The Hard Way (1916)
 Burnt Wings (1916)
 The Odds Against Her (1919)

References

External links
 

Year of birth missing
Year of death missing
British male film actors
British male stage actors